Poisonous Mentality is the second album released by rap group, Poison Clan. It was released on April 7, 1992 for Luke Records and was produced by JT Money, Devastator, Mike "Fresh" McRay and Luther Campbell. The album found mild success, peaking at #62 on the Top R&B/Hip-Hop Albums and #20 on the Top Heatseekers. By the time this album was released, Debonaire had left the group and was replaced by Uzi and Madball.

Track listing
 All songs written by Jeff Thompkins, except as indicated.
"JT's Dream" - 2:46  
"Inside Edition" - 2:49  
"All They Good 4" - 3:11  
"Uzi Gets Shot" - :18  
"Action" (featuring Likkle Wicked) - 3:14  
"Livin' in the City" - 3:54  
"Raymond Up the Road" - :18  
"Fugitive" - 3:15  
"Ho Stories" - 3:20  
"JT's Confession" - :39  
"I Hate Ho's" (featuring Devastator) - 3:12  
"Drugz Bullshitin'" - :15  
"Rough Nigga Gettin' Busy" - 4:26  
"The Tip on Madball" - :28  
"Some Shit I Used to Do" - 4:00  
"That Was Ram" - :40  
"Groove With the PC" - 3:53  
"JT Ole Boy" - :09  
"No Haps" (Jeff Thompkins, Eddie Miller) - 4:43  
"Shake Whatcha Mama Gave Ya" (featuring Devastator) - 3:24  
"Big Nose"- :35  
"Somethin' 4 You Raggedy Ho's" (featuring Bust Down) - 4:14  
"Shorty T in Madball's Basement" - :20  
"Shout Outs" - 5:23

Personnel
 Debbie Bennett - additional vocals
 Eddie Miller - keyboards, additional music, recording engineer, mixing
 Luther Campbell - executive producer, additional vocals
 Mastersound - mastering
 Mac Hartshorn - photography
 Milton Mizell - graphic design

References

1992 albums
Poison Clan albums
Luke Records albums